Machine Cuisine is an EP by Six Finger Satellite, released on August 23, 1994, through Sub Pop.

Track listing

Personnel 
Six Finger Satellite
John MacLean – guitar, moog synthesizer, organ
Kurt Niemand – bass guitar
Richard D. Pelletier – drums
Peter Phillips – guitar, vocals
Jeremiah Ryan – vocals

References

External links 
 

1994 EPs
Six Finger Satellite albums
Sub Pop EPs